"The City" is the debut single by English rock band The 1975, released in 2012. The song was originally recorded for their debut extended play Facedown, with a re-recorded version later appearing on their fourth extended play IV and (in edited form) as the second track on their self-titled debut. It was re-released as a single in 2013 in the form of a re-recorded version (edited for their debut album) which peaked at number 30 on the UK Singles Chart and number 27 on the Scottish Singles Chart. The song also featured in the game FIFA 14.

Background
"The City" was originally released by the band in 2012 on their debut EP, Facedown. After the band released their breakthrough single, "Chocolate", they originally intended to follow up with releasing "Settle Down". During the band's interview with Zane Lowe on BBC Radio 1 in April 2013, singer Matty Healy revealed they had only been sent the new mix of the song weeks prior and so decided to re-release it as a single and on the new EP.

Music video 
A second music video to accompany the re-release of "The City" was first released onto YouTube on 25 April 2013 at a total length of three minutes and thirty-seven seconds.

Track listing

Performance

Release history

References

2012 songs
2012 debut singles
2013 singles
Songs written by Matthew Healy
The 1975 songs
Black-and-white music videos
Dirty Hit singles